"Il mondo prima di te" is a song by Italian singer-songwriter Annalisa. It was written by Annalisa, Davide Simonetta and Alessandro Raina, and produced by Michele Canova.

It was released by Warner Music Italy on 6 February 2018 as the second single from her sixth studio album Bye Bye. The song was Annalisa's entry for the Sanremo Music Festival 2018, the 68th edition of Italy's musical festival which doubles also as a selection of the act for Eurovision Song Contest, where it placed third in the grand final. "Il mondo prima di te" peaked at number 3 on the FIMI Singles Chart and was certified platinum in Italy.

Music video
A music video to accompany the release of "Il mondo prima di te" was first released onto YouTube on 7 February 2021. The video was directed by YouNuts! and shot in Lanzarote.

Personnel
Credits adapted from Tidal.
 Michele Canova Iorfida – producer, keyboards, mixer, rhythm programmer
 Alessandro Raina – composer
 Annalisa Scarrone – composer, lyricist, vocals, vocal arranger
 Davide Simonetta – composer, lyricist
 Tim Pierce – guitar
 Patrizio Simonini – keyboards programmer, mixer, pre-production, rhythm programmer
 Antonio Baglio – masterer
 Alex Alessandroni Jr – piano, rhodes solo, synthesizer

Track listing

Charts

Certifications

References

2018 singles
2018 songs
Annalisa songs
Sanremo Music Festival songs
Songs written by Davide Simonetta
Songs written by Annalisa